Lyse (Norwegian for (to) light) is an industrial and multi-utility company based in Jæren and Ryfylke, Norway. The company has a yearly normal production of 9.5 TWh of hydroelectric power, develops and maintains the power grid in 14 municipalities as well as deliver fiberoptic broadband (Altibox) and other telecommunication services, natural gas distribution, district heating, retailing and installation services. The company's head office is located in Stavanger, Norway.

The company is owned by the municipalities of Stavanger (45.74%), Sandnes (19.53%), Sola (8.74%), Time (5.83%), Klepp (4.23%), Hå (3.78%), Randaberg (3.28%), Eigersund (2.95%), Strand (2.53%), Hjelmeland (0.99%), Gjesdal (0.93%), Lund (0.71%), Bjerkreim (0.51%) and Kvitsøy (0.23%).

Power plants
Through Lyse Kraft DA (74.4%) the company owns the hydroelectric power stations of Suldal I, Suldal II, Røldal, Novle, Kvanndalen, Middyr, Svandalsfona, Hjelmeland, Breiava, Flørli, Hauskje, Hetland, Lysebotn II, Maudal, Oltesvik, Sviland, Tjodan, Vasstøl, Midtlæger, Ulla-Førre and Sira-Kvina.

The company also has shares in Jørpeland hydroelectric power station and in thermal power plant Bærheim.

History
Lyse's roots go back to the establishment of the first electricity plants at the beginning of the 20th century, which became the engine in the industrialization and modernization of Norway. In 1947, the company Lyse Kraft DA was established with the aim of expanding the hydropower resources in Lysebotn. The name Lyse is inspired by the Lyse river in Lysebotn. 

The company was founded in 1999 as a merger between the municipal power companies in Stavanger, Sandnes, Sola, Time as well as Ryfylke Energi and Lyse Kraft.

In 2015, the company changed its name from Lyse Energi AS to Lyse AS.

In 2020, the company merged its portfolio power plants with Hydro, becoming one of the largest hydroelectric power producers in Norway. As a part of the transaction Hydro acquired the operatorship of Lyse's power plants.

In March 2022, Ice Group sold its operating activities to Lyse AS.

See also

 Scotland-Norway interconnector

References

External links

Electric power companies of Norway
Natural gas companies of Norway
Telecommunications companies of Norway
Internet service providers of Norway
Security companies of Norway
Companies based in Stavanger
Energy companies established in 1999
Companies owned by municipalities of Norway
Norwegian companies established in 1999